The Honourable David Alexander Reginald Herbert (3 October 1908 – 3 April 1995) was a British socialite and writer.

Early life and education
He was the second son of Reginald Herbert, 15th Earl of Pembroke. He spent his first few years in Castletown, Ireland. At the age of four, he moved to the family home of Wilton, near Salisbury. Attending Wixenford Preparatory School, he was later sent on to Eton.

Performing career

He had brief stints as both a film actor, appearing in 1930's Knowing Men, and as a cabaret performer. He briefly shared an apartment with Noël Coward in the East End, and was satirized by Lord Berners as the character Daisy Montgomery in his 1936 satiric novel, The Girls of Radcliff Hall. He was also scathingly satirized as "Peter Barclay" in William Bayer's novel Tangier.

Life in Tangier
He spent almost fifty years in Tangier, Morocco where he was known for his vibrant personality, frequent lavish parties, good taste, and ruthless snobbery. He was referred to by Ian Fleming as 'the Queen of Tangier'. He was labeled as the 'most terrible snob' by author Patrick Thursfield, who regularly enjoyed attending his famous parties.

Death
He died of kidney failure in 1995 and was buried in the cemetery at Saint Andrew's Church. He had been a devout Anglican. On his tombstone was engraved, "He loved Morocco".

Writing career
His books, with vitality and wit, recall his years in the company of such figures as Cecil Beaton, Lady Diana Cooper, Noël Coward, Paul and Jane Bowles, Cyril Connolly, Brian Howard, Barbara Hutton, Osbert Sitwell and Tallulah Bankhead. These include Second Son: An Autobiography (1972), which included a foreword by Paul Bowles and photographs by Cecil Beaton, Engaging Eccentrics: Recollections (1990), his second volume of autobiography, and Relations and Revelations: Advice to Jemima (1992), a book of memories and opinions written in the form of advice to his great-niece Jemima.

References

External links
A Biography of David Herbert by Kenneth Lisenbee

Information on Wilton House, home of the Earl of Pembroke

1908 births
1995 deaths
20th-century Anglicans
20th-century English male actors
20th-century English memoirists
English socialites
Younger sons of earls
People educated at Eton College
People educated at Wixenford School
English people of Russian descent
English interior designers
British expatriates in Morocco
Deaths from kidney failure
English Anglicans
British cabaret performers
Herbert family